Michael Lamar White II (born June 18, 1999), known professionally as Trippie Redd, is an American rapper and singer-songwriter. He is one of the most prominent members of the SoundCloud rap scene, which gained mainstream acclaim in the late 2010s. His debut mixtape, A Love Letter to You (2017), and its lead single, "Love Scars", propelled him to popularity.

Trippie Redd's singles "Dark Knight Dummo", "Taking a Walk", and "Topanga" all reached the Billboard Hot 100. His debut studio album, Life's a Trip (2018), and sophomore album, ! (2019), both reached the top five of the Billboard 200, while his fourth mixtape, A Love Letter to You 4 (2019), topped the chart. Trippie Redd's third studio album, Pegasus (2020) and his fourth studio album Trip at Knight (2021) both reached number two on the Billboard 200.

Early life
White has a younger brother nicknamed "Hippie Redd" and had an older brother who made music under the name "Dirty Redd". Dirty Redd was killed in a car accident in 2014, and White talked to Rolling Stone about the time following the fatal accident. White grew up in Canton, though he moved to Columbus, Ohio, several times. His interest in music began when his mother played Ashanti, Beyoncé, Tupac, and Nas while White was growing up. He later listened to artists such as T-Pain, Kiss, Nirvana, Gucci Mane, Fountains of Wayne, the Ataris, Green Day, the Offspring, Cute Is What We Aim For, Simple Plan, the Summer Set, Hit the Lights, Marilyn Manson and Lil Wayne. White began rapping after being inspired by Taevion Williams, another rapper who went by the stage name Lil Tae. White began taking his music career seriously and began recording music, releasing "Sub-Zero" and "New Ferrari" in 2014 but soon deleting those songs.

Following his high school graduation, White moved to Atlanta, where he met rapper Lil Wop and was eventually offered a deal with a record label.

Career

2016–2018: Career beginnings and Life's a Trip
Lil Wop helped White get started with a professional recording studio. They began working with Kodie Shane and recorded three projects: Awakening My Inner Beast, Beast Mode and Rock the World Trippie. White eventually signed to the label Strainge Entertainment (now known as Elliot Grainge Entertainment) and relocated to Los Angeles.

On May 26, 2017, White released his debut mixtape, A Love Letter to You, with the lead single "Love Scars", which received more than 8 million views on YouTube within several months and more than 13 million on SoundCloud. White was included on XXXTentacion's album 17, on the song "Fuck Love", which peaked at number 28 on the Billboard Hot 100.

On October 6, 2017, White released his second mixtape, A Love Letter to You 2. The album debuted at number 34 on the Billboard 200. Later that month, White released a collaboration EP with Lil Wop, Angels & Demons.

On December 6, 2017, White released the single "Dark Knight Dummo", featuring Travis Scott. The song peaked at 72 on the Billboard Hot 100, making it White's first entry on the chart as a lead artist. On December 25, 2017, White released the song "TR666" on his SoundCloud account, which features Swae Lee and was produced by Scott Storch. The track was previewed on November 30. White released "18" alongside Baauer, Kris Wu, Joji and Rich Brian.

In an interview with Billboard in March 2018, White said his debut studio album would feature collaborations with Lil Wayne and Erykah Badu. In July 2018, White announced that the album would be titled Life's a Trip and be 26 tracks long; he later trimmed it to 16 tracks. White released the singles "Me Likey" and "How You Feel" on June 22, 2018, and "Taking a Walk" on August 6, 2018. Life's a Trip was released August 10, 2018, and debuted at number four on the Billboard 200 album chart, with the single "Taking a Walk" debuting at number 46 on the Billboard Hot 100 chart. Later in 2018, Trippie Redd released A Love Letter to You 3, which reached number three on the Billboard 200.

2019–2020: !, A Love Letter to You 4, and Pegasus

On May 29, 2019, White released "Under Enemy Arms", the lead single to his second studio album !. On July 24, 2019, White released the second single for the album,"Mac 10", featuring American rappers Lil Baby and Lil Duke. The album was released on August 9, 2019, and debuted at number three on the US Billboard 200 with 51,000 album-equivalent units.  The album received lukewarm receives and, amid criticism, White removed the song "They Afraid Of You", featuring Playboi Carti, from the album. White went on to release A Love Letter to You 4 that November. The mixtape debuted at number one on the Billboard 200, becoming his first chart-topping album.

Following this, White featured on several songs in the first half of 2020. He appeared on English YouTuber, media personality, and rapper KSI's single "Wake Up Call", which was released on January 31, 2020. The song serves as the second single to the latter's debut studio album, Dissimulation. The song reached number 11 on the UK Singles Chart. He also released a collaboration with Juice Wrld titled "Tell Me U Luv Me", which reached the top 40 on the Billboard Hot 100. On May 15, 2020, White released the single "Excitement" with PartyNextDoor, as the lead single for his third studio album, Pegasus. On June 18, which was his 21st birthday, he released another single titled "Dreamer", a single for Neon Shark, the deluxe edition of Pegasus, which would be his "rock album". On August 18, the entire album leaked after White had stated that he would delay the album even further if more of his music continued to leak online. On September 11, he released the single "I Got You", featuring Busta Rhymes, as the second single from Pegasus. On October 7, he released the third and final single, "Sleepy Hollow", from the album. The album was released on October 30, 2020, and debuted at number two on the Billboard 200.

2021–2022: Trip at Knight

White began the year by releasing the deluxe edition of Pegasus, a rock reissue titled Neon Shark vs Pegasus. He later announced his fourth studio album Trip at Knight, which was expected to release later in the year. In the lead-up to the album's release, White released two high-profile collaborations. The first, "Miss the Rage" featuring Playboi Carti, debuted at number 11 on the Billboard Hot 100, becoming the highest-charting single of White's career. The second lead single was "Holy Smokes" featuring Lil Uzi Vert, which peaked at number 50 on the Hot 100. On August 11, White announced the album's tracklist, as well as a tour set to begin on August 25. Trip at Knight released on August 20th, 2021, with the song "Betrayal" featuring Drake added to the album's track listing a day late on August 21st, 2021.

On September 9, 2021, someone had opened fire on White's tour bus, striking the driver.

2023: Mansion Musik

White released his fifth studio album, Mansion Musik on January 20, 2023. The album is executively produced by Chief Keef, whom is featured on two tracks. White is expected to release his fifth mixtape sometime in 2023, titled A Love Letter To You 5. The album "Mansion Musik features other famous rappers including Future, Lil Baby, Juice Word, Travis Scott, Lil Durk, Ski Mask the Slump God, Dababy and Kodak Black. In a interview with Zane Lowe, he spoke about how the album was inspired by wanting to "touch bases with different types of rage" and translate those feelings into music. Before the release of this album, there has been much "hype" (built up excitement) and has reached out to all his fans out there. This album has been a great success and is gaining multiple streams on music software including Spotify and Soundcloud.

Controversies

6ix9ine
On April 13, 2017, 6ix9ine featured on White's song "Poles 1469" and in July 2017, he was also featured on White's song "Owee". Following a post from a Twitter account claiming 6ix9ine was a pedophile, White denounced 6ix9ine. On November 11, 2017, White was attacked in a New York hotel and claimed that a member of 6ix9ine's team ambushed him. 6ix9ine later insinuated his involvement. In February 2018, 6ix9ine was assaulted by several men outside of a Los Angeles airport shortly after arguing with White on Instagram. 6ix9ine and White continued to trade insults over social media in February 2018 and March 2018.

In May 2018, 6ix9ine started a feud with rapper Tadoe and Chief Keef over allegations that Tadoe had abused artist Cuban Doll for talking to 6ix9ine. White supported Tadoe in the feud and went on to release a diss track toward 6ix9ine, "I Kill People", featuring Tadoe and Chief Keef.

6ix9ine also accused White of having sexual relations with fellow rapper Danielle Bregoli, also known as Bhad Bhabie, who was a minor at the time. White and Bregoli denied the accusation, but the latter admitted that the two had kissed in the past: "We kissed but it wasn't that serious and he was 17 at the time."

On September 17, 2019, 6ix9ine has stated in a testimony that White has been involved with the Five Nine Brims gang.

XXXTentacion
In October 2017, a preview of Drake's song "God's Plan" was shown on social media. The song originally featured White singing the hook and giving an additional verse. Florida rapper Jahseh Onfroy, known by his stage name XXXTentacion, who had prior issues with Drake, began to associate with 6ix9ine, to White's chagrin. In March 2018, Onfroy "banned" White from Florida, promising to assault him if he attempted to enter the state. Onfroy apologized to White during a performance later that month, and the two reconciled after White accepted his apology. White and Onfroy went on to collaborate on multiple occasions.

Following XXXTentacion's death on June 18, 2018, which was also White's 19th birthday, White dyed his hair in memory of the artist and released "Ghost Busters", a collaboration with Quavo, XXXTentacion and Ski Mask the Slump God in memoriam. In a 2021 interview, White said that he still thought about XXXTentacion every day. On White's 2021 album Trip At Knight, a posthumous collaborative song with White and XXXTentacion titled "Danny Phantom" was released, which was a reworked version of "Ghost Busters".

Personal life
White said in March 2017 that he was worth $7 million and purchased his mother a $300,000 home. In 2022, White signed a 30 million dollar record deal with 10K projects. After signing the deal, he purchased a 7.5 million dollar Florida mansion.

Legal issues
White was arrested in Cobb County, Georgia following an assault on rapper FDM Grady in late May 2018. According to Grady, White and rapper Lil Wop insulted Grady's girlfriend, leading Grady to draw a firearm briefly before engaging in a fist fight with White. At that point, Grady was attacked by four men including White and Wop. White was arrested on charges of affray (public fighting), criminal trespass and simple battery. A few weeks later in early June, White was again arrested in Georgia on an assault charge for allegedly pistol-whipping a woman.

Discography

Studio albums 
 Life's a Trip (2018)
 ! (2019)
 Pegasus (2020)
 Trip at Knight (2021)
 Mansion Musik (2023)

Filmography

References

1999 births
Living people
21st-century African-American male singers
21st-century American rappers
African-American male rappers
African-American male singer-songwriters
African-American rock singers
Alternative rock singers
American contemporary R&B singers
American hip hop singers
American people who self-identify as being of Native American descent
American rock songwriters
American alternative rock musicians
Bloods
Mumble rappers
Emo rap musicians
Pop rappers
Musicians from Canton, Ohio
Rappers from Ohio
Singer-songwriters from Ohio
Universal Music Group artists